Los Angeles is a colour photograph made by German visual artist Andreas Gursky in 1998. It is an edition of six. The image was manipulated by computer, following the artist usual process. Its one of the largest examples of the artist's work. It depicts Los Angeles, California, at night, under a very dark sky, with the city lights shining through. The cosmic-like vision of the city even gives the impression of showing part of the Earth's curvature. A print of Los Angeles was sold at Sotheby's, London, by $2,900,000 on 27 February 2008. One copy, signed and dated in the reverse: "A Gursky "Los Angeles" 4/6 '98'" sold at a London Auction on 6 October 2017 for £1,689,000.

Prints of the picture are held at The Broad Museum, in Los Angeles, and at the Harvard Art Museums.

See also
 List of most expensive photographs

References

Color photographs
Photographs by Andreas Gursky
1998 works
1998 in art
1990s photographs
Collection of The Broad